The Nashville Xpress Minor League Baseball team played two seasons in Nashville, Tennessee, from 1993 to 1994 as the Double-A affiliate of the Minnesota Twins. In those seasons, a total of 60 players competed in at least one game for the Xpress. The 1993 roster included a total of 35 players, while 38 played for the team in 1994. There were 13 players who were members of the team in both seasons. Of the 60 all-time Xpress players, 22 also played in at least one game for a Major League Baseball (MLB) team during their careers.

After the 1992 baseball season, Charlotte, North Carolina, home of the Double-A Southern League's Charlotte Knights, acquired a Triple-A expansion team in the International League, leaving the Southern League franchise in need of a new home. Larry Schmittou, president of the Triple-A Nashville Sounds, offered Herschel Greer Stadium as a temporary home for the displaced team until owner George Shinn could find a permanent home for his club. Upon the league's approval, the franchise relocated to Nashville and became the Nashville Xpress. In order to accommodate two teams at Greer, the Xpress' games were scheduled for during the Sounds' road trips.

As no other solution could be reached for 1994, Schmittou allowed the franchise to remain at Greer for a second season. Meanwhile, in October 1993, Dennis Bastien purchased the Xpress with the intention of moving the club to Lexington, Kentucky, for the 1995 season, but those plans fell through when he was unable to broker a financial deal with the city to build a ballpark. Bastien later arrived at terms to relocate to Springfield, Missouri, in 1997. The Xpress left Nashville after the 1994 campaign to play on an interim basis in Wilmington, North Carolina, where they were known as the Port City Roosters in 1995 and 1996. The team, however, never made it to Springfield after the city was unable to secure federal funding for a ballpark. The forlorn franchise was subsequently sold and placed in Mobile, Alabama, as the Mobile BayBears in 1997.

Nashville pitcher Oscar Múñoz and outfielder Rich Becker were selected for the 1993 Double-A All-Star Game. Becker was also named to the Southern League's postseason All-Star team. Múñoz was chosen to receive the 1993 Southern League Most Outstanding Pitcher Award. In 1994, Xpress pitchers LaTroy Hawkins and Marc Barcelo were selected for the Double-A All-Star Game, and right-hander Brad Radke was named to the league's postseason All-Star squad.

Three players went on to be selected to play in Major League Baseball All-Star Games after their stints in Nashville: Eddie Guardado (2002 & 2003), Damian Miller (2002), and Brad Radke (1998). In 1995, Marty Cordova was voted the American League Rookie of the Year. Three Xpress players also played for the Nashville Sounds: LaTroy Hawkins (2010–11), Todd Ritchie (1999), and Scott Cepicky (1993—one season before playing for the Xpress).

Table key

Players

Notes 
Table keys

MLB award winners and All-Stars

References 
Specific

General

All-time roster